Aberson is a surname. Notable people with the surname include:

Cliff Aberson (1921–1973), American football and baseball player
Helen Aberson-Mayer (1907–1999), American children's author

See also
Amerson